Thomas Carleton Allen,  (November 1852 in Fredericton, New Brunswick – 22 September 1927) was a Canadian attorney who was a former mayor of the city of Fredericton, 1890–1892.

Family

He was the son of Sir John Campbell Allen and Margaret Austen Drury. His father was for many years Chief 
Justice of N. B., and mayor of Fredericton in 1851.

Education and legal career
He was educated at Fredericton Collegiate Schools until 1868. After completing his general studies at the Charlotte County Grammar School, he studied law with Messrs. Botsford and Wetmore of Fredericton and with Messrs. Duff and Jeremiah Norman Travis of St. John. He graduated from Harvard Law School with a degree of Bachelor of Laws and later pursued a special course at the same institution. He was admitted an attorney, Oct., 1874, and was admitted as a barrister the following year. He practised alone in Fredericton, N. B., until 1878, when he moved to St. John, and became identified with W. B. Chandler under the name of Chandler and Allen, which firm existed until 1883. He was appointed Clerk of the Pleas and Court in Equity, Apr., 1883. While in practice he was retained as counsel for Mrs. Merritt of New York, who contested the will of Charles Merritt, which involved a large estate and which, after being in the court for three years, was settled out of court.

Personal life
He married Louise Wetmore on December, 1878; they had two sons, one daughter.

References

External links 
  T. Carleton Allen fonds
 T. Carleton Allen fonds (archive)
 

1852 births
1927 deaths
Harvard Law School alumni
Mayors of Fredericton